Triple Eight Race Engineering, (branded as Red Bull Ampol Racing) is an Australian motor racing team competing in the Supercars Championship. The team has been the only Brisbane based V8 Supercar team since its formation, originally operating out of the former Briggs Motor Sport workshop in Bowen Hills before moving to Banyo in 2009. Since taking over the former Briggs Motor Sport team during the 2003 season the team has won the Supercars driver's championship ten times, the team's championship eleven times and the Bathurst 1000 nine times.

The team currently runs two Holden ZB Commodores for Broc Feeney and Shane van Gisbergen. Additionally, the team provides technical support to Team Sydney, Team 18 and Matt Stone Racing. The team performs its testing at Queensland Raceway.

Originally affiliated with champion British Touring Car Championship race team Triple Eight Racing and owned by Peter Butterly, Roland Dane, Ian Harrison and Derek Warwick, Dane later took majority ownership, with Harrison maintaining a minority shareholding. In late 2015, Dane sold a ~ 30% shareholding in the team to Paul Dumbrell, Tim Miles and Trinette Schipkie.
In 2021 Scottish Millionaire Tony Quinn bought a 40% Share of the team.

History
Triple Eight Race Engineering was formed in 1996 in the United Kingdom, running Vauxhall's program in the British Touring Car Championship before expanding into Australian V8 Supercars, purchasing the Briggs Motor Sport team in September 2003. The sale included a custom-built facility in the Brisbane suburb of Bowen Hills, and a staff of 35 people. Engineers in Brisbane worked closely with the Triple Eight staff in the UK to build two new Ford BA Falcons, while the team principals managed to attract substantial financial support from Ford.

Team Betta Electrical

The team debuted at the 2003 Sandown 500. 2004 was Triple Eight's first full season in V8 Supercars. It was a disappointing year for all involved, with both cars dogged by mechanical problems. Paul Radisich came 19th in the championship, while Max Wilson finished a lowly 28th. The team's car speed, however, was certainly up with the front-runners for many weekends.

2005 saw a massive form reversal for Triple Eight. Craig Lowndes and Steve Ellery were signed as drivers and Stone Brothers Racing engineer Campbell Little joined the team. Lowndes in particular was a catalyst for change, which along with powerful and reliable Stone Brothers Racing sourced engines saw a massive improvement in the team's performance. Lowndes finished second in the championship, finishing the year strongly and narrowly missing out on snatching the title from Russell Ingall. Ellery came 13th. The year's highlights included a win for Lowndes and Yvan Muller at the Sandown 500 and a third placing for Ellery and Adam Macrow at the Bathurst 1000. Lowndes won a further three rounds and qualified on pole position four times (including Bathurst).

2006 saw a continuation of this strong form, with new recruit Jamie Whincup replacing Ellery, and making an instant impact in the form of a win at the Clipsal 500. Lowndes scored four round wins, including sharing victory at the Bathurst 1000 with Whincup.

Having led the championship to Round 11, Lowndes lost the series lead at the Symmons Plains weekend. Having seen a big chunk of his lead evaporate at the previous round on the Gold Coast following two penalties for dangerous driving approaching the starting grid, the pressure was on Lowndes to perform at the Tasmania event. Unfortunately for Lowndes, he was caught in a massive crash on the opening lap of the first race, forcing him to the rear of the grid for the next race. He recovered, but he lost the series lead to Rick Kelly, who took a handy 73-point lead. At the next round in Bahrain, Lowndes stormed back into contention as Kelly encountered problems of his own. The stage was set for a spectacular finale at Phillip Island, with the two contenders separated by just seven points.

Lowndes qualified on the third row of the grid, while Kelly was further back on the fifth row. However, Kelly fought back in the first race to be right on Lowndes' bumper at the conclusion of the race – Lowndes was fourth, Kelly fifth. In the second race, Lowndes came third while Kelly was fourth – again close behind. The points going into the final race of the year were tied. On the second lap of the final race, Kelly pushed Lowndes on the rear bumper while in the high-speed section between Turns 3 and 4, sending Lowndes into a spin, eventually cleaning out both Lowndes and Todd Kelly (Rick's older brother). Rick Kelly was given a drive-through penalty and finished 18th. Lowndes' car was extensively damaged and was only able to salvage 29th place. Rick Kelly had won the championship.

However, Lowndes and his Triple Eight team protested, claiming that Kelly had deliberately taken Lowndes out of the race. The stewards, after deliberation, dismissed the appeal, saying that the drive-through penalty was sufficient punishment for Kelly. Furthermore, Lowndes and Triple Eight accused the HSV Dealer Team and the Holden Racing Team for bad sportsmanship – Mark Skaife was given a bad sportsmanship flag in Race 1 for blocking Lowndes, while Kelly's teammate Garth Tander was given a drive-through penalty for blocking Lowndes in Race 2. Some days later, Lowndes was awarded the prized Barry Sheene Medal, which was some consolation.

Team Vodafone

In 2007, the team retained the services of Jamie Whincup and Craig Lowndes. Vodafone replaced Betta Electrical as the title sponsor. Whincup narrowly missed out on the Drivers Championship by 2 points, with Garth Tander and Toll HSV Racing Team winning the last race of the season in Phillip Island.

In 2008, Whincup won the championship, and Lowndes and Whincup won their third Bathurst 1000 crown. During the 2008 Season, it was announced at the Hidden Valley round that Ford would withdraw its support from all but two teams (Ford Performance Racing and Stone Brothers Racing) on the Supercars grid from 2009 onwards. Triple Eight was one of the Ford teams to be effected by the decision, despite proving that they were the top Ford team that year and would go on to win their third Bathurst 1000 and first drivers championship as well as being the head developers of the new FG Falcon which was to be introduced in 2009. It was estimated that due to the decision by Ford, Triple Eight lost $2 million from their budget annually.

In 2009, following Ford's decision to withdraw support from all teams other than Ford Performance Racing and Stone Brothers Racing, the Ford logos on the front of the cars were replaced by a stylised pink pig's head, referring to Hog's Breath Cafe, one of the team sponsors. The team ran new FG Falcons. Triple Eight Racing won fifteen of the twenty-three races staged during the championship, with Whincup winning eleven races and the championship and Lowndes taking four wins at Winton, the Gold Coast and Barbagallo, finishing the year in fourth. Due to the loss of factory support from Ford for the 2009 season. Triple Eight announced prior to Bathurst that the team would be controversially switching to arch rival Holden for 2010 onwards.

Change to Holden

In 2010 the team switched to racing Holden VE Commodores in response to the withdrawal of Ford's support, after signing a three-year deal with Holden. The team also re-signed with major sponsor Vodafone for another three years until the end of the 2012 season.

The team celebrated the first race of the year with a 1-2 finish with Jamie Whincup and Craig Lowndes respectively. Jamie Whincup won both races in Abu Dhabi, Bahrain, and Hamilton, but lost the championship lead after troubled races at Queensland Raceway and Winton, while teammate Craig Lowndes finished on the podium several times. They also had a great result at Bathurst with a 1-2 finish with Craig Lowndes, Mark Skaife and Jamie Whincup, Steve Owen respectively. Whincup finished the year in 2nd, with Lowndes in 4th.

In 2011, Whincup regained the championship from Lowndes with the team winning the Teams Championship.

During the 2012 season, Triple Eight dominated, winning 19 races including the Sandown 500 (Lowndes and Warren Luff) and the Bathurst 1000 (Whincup and Paul Dumbrell) with Whincup won the title from Lowndes.

Red Bull Racing Australia

In June 2012, Vodafone announced it would not renew the sponsorship. In August 2012, Red Bull took over the naming rights for the 2013 V8 Supercars season onwards.

In the 2013 season, the new Car of the Future specification cars were introduced with Triple Eight racing the new Holden VF Commodore. Whincup and Lowndes finished first and second in the championship.

Lowndes is contracted until the end of 2017, and Whincup until the end of 2018. In 2016, a third car was added for Shane van Gisbergen, with the team purchasing a Racing Entitlement Contract that was last used in 2014 by James Rosenberg Racing.
Van Gisbergen won the 2016 championship.

Team Vortex

In 2016, Lowndes raced under the banner of Team Vortex, with Whincup and van Gisbergen under the Red Bull Racing Australia banner.

Autobarn Lowndes Racing
In 2018, Lowndes raced under the banner of Autobarn Lowndes Racing, with Whincup and van Gisbergen under the Red Bull Holden Racing Team banner.

Red Bull Holden Racing Team

From 2017 until 2020, Triple Eight was the factory Holden team being rebranded as the Red Bull Holden Racing Team. The team was responsible for developing the ZB Commodore that debut in 2018. They also lead development for the expected V6 twin-turbo engine that was to be the replacement to the V8 engine in the future, all without the guidance of former technical director Ludo Lacroix. However in April 2018, Holden announced it had chosen to halt the development of the turbocharged V6 engine and that it would be sticking with its V8 layout for the time being. This meant that the scheduled wildcard entry the team was planning to enter never happened.

Red Bull Ampol Racing

For 2021 and beyond, Triple Eight rebranded to Red Bull Ampol Racing due to the Holden brand being retired at the end of 2020. This was the first time that Triple Eight raced without factory support from Holden since joining the brand in 2010 and only the second time in its V8 Supercars history without any factory support (the last time being 2009). Ampol, formerly known as Caltex Australia, replaced Holden as one of Triple Eight's major sponsors alongside longtime partner Red Bull.

Despite the name change, Triple Eight continued with Holden Commodores for the next two years where the Chevrolet Camaro is due to make its debut in 2023 along with Gen3. Jamie Whincup began his 16th and final full time season with Triple Eight while Shane Van Gisbergen began his 6th.

Wildcard entries
The team entered an extra car at the 2013 Bathurst 1000, running under the banner of Xbox One Racing and driven by Andy Priaulx and Mattias Ekström. They qualified in 18th and finished in 10th.

For the 2021 Bathurst 1000 the team ran a Supercheap Auto backed Holden ZB Commodore which was driven by former Super3 Champion Broc Feeney and former Supercars champion Russell Ingall.

For the 2022 Bathurst 1000 will run a Holden ZB Commodore under the banner Supercheap Auto Racing and driven will be by 3x Supercars champion and 7x Bathurst 1000 winner Craig Lowndes and current Super2 driver Declan Fraser.

Development series
Triple Eight have previously entered cars in the Development Series for Andrew Thompson in 2011, Scott Pye in 2012 and Casey Stoner in 2013, winning the series in 2011. Since 2014 Triple Eight has provided technical assistance to Eggleston Motorsport.
For the 2019 season Triple Eight have re-entered the development series, Super2. Fielding two cars for Brenton Grove and Kurt Kostecki.
For the 2020 season they scaled the team down to one car driven by 2019 Australian Formula Ford Champion Angelo Mouzouris.
For the 2021 season they had gone back to a two car operation with Angelo Mouzouris being joined by ex-Tickford Super2 driver Broc Feeney.

Car supplier
As well as building cars for its own use, Triple Eight has also built cars for other teams. It has provided chassis for Dick Johnson Racing (2009–2012), Paul Morris Motorsport (2010–2012), Tekno Autosports (2010–2021), Lucas Dumbrell Motorsport (2012–2017), Team 18 (2016–present), Matt Stone Racing (2018–present) and PremiAir Racing (2022–present).

Supercar drivers
The following is a list of drivers who have driven for the team in the Supercars Championship, in order of their first appearance. Drivers who only drove for the team on a part-time basis are listed in italics.

 Paul Radisich (2003–04)
 Dean Canto (2003–04)
 Rickard Rydell (2003)
 Max Wilson (2004)
 Yvan Muller (2004–05)
 Steven Ellery (2005)
 Craig Lowndes (2005–present)
 Adam Macrow (2005)
 Jamie Whincup (2006–present)
 Allan Simonsen (2006–07, 2009)
 Richard Lyons (2006–07, 2012)
 Fabrizio Giovanardi (2008)
 Marc Hynes (2008)
 James Thompson (2009)
 Steve Owen (2010)
 Mark Skaife (2010–11)
 Andy Priaulx (2010–11, 2013)
 Andrew Thompson (2011)
 Sébastien Bourdais (2011–12)
 Paul Dumbrell (2012–18)
 Warren Luff (2012–13)
 Mattias Ekström (2013)
 Steven Richards (2014–18)
 Shane van Gisbergen (2016–present)
 Alexandre Prémat (2016)
 Matt Campbell (2017)
 Earl Bamber (2018)
 Garth Tander (2019–22)
 Broc Feeney (2021–present)
 Russell Ingall (2021)
 Declan Fraser  (2022)
 Richie Stanaway (2023)
 Zane Goddard (2023)

Super2 drivers
The following is a list of drivers who have driven for the team in the Super2 Series, in order of their first appearance. Drivers who drove for the team on a part-time basis are listed in Italics

 Andrew Thompson (2011)
 Scott Pye (2012)
 Casey Stoner (2013)
 Kurt Kostecki (2019)
 Brenton Grove (2019)
 Angelo Mouzouris (2020−21)
 Broc Feeney (2021)
 Cameron Hill (2022)
 Declan Fraser (2022)

Complete Bathurst 1000 Results

References

External links

Triple Eight Race Engineering

Australian auto racing teams
Banyo, Queensland
Red Bull Racing Australia
Sport in Brisbane
Sports teams in Queensland
Supercars Championship teams
Holden in motorsport
Mercedes-Benz in motorsport
Auto racing teams established in 1996
1996 establishments in the United Kingdom